A don is a fellow or tutor of a college or university, especially traditional collegiate universities such as Oxford and Cambridge in England and Trinity College Dublin in Ireland. The usage is also found in Canada. 

Like the term don used for Roman Catholic priests, the term don derives from the Latin dominus, meaning "lord", and is a historical remnant of Oxford and Cambridge having started as ecclesiastical institutions in the Middle Ages. 

The term don is also used for  schoolmasters at Winchester College, where as well as the term generally meaning "teacher", there are also "Div Dons", form masters, and "House Dons", housemasters; and at Radley College, another boys-only boarding school modelled after Oxford colleges of the early 19th century.

At some universities in Canada, such as the University of King's College and the University of New Brunswick, a don is the senior head of a university residence. At these institutions, a don is typically a faculty member, staff member, or postgraduate student, whose responsibilities in the residence are primarily administrative.  The don supervises their residence and a team of undergraduate resident assistants, proctors, or other student employees.  

In other Canadian institutions, such as Huron College and the University of Toronto, a don is a resident assistant, typically an upper-year student paid a stipend to act as an advisor to and supervisor of the students in a university residence.

See also
 Academic rank

Notes

Academic terminology
Don
Don
Education and training occupations
Academic titles